Quintus Pompeius Senecio Sosius Priscus (fl. 2nd century) was a Roman senator who was appointed consul during the reign of Marcus Aurelius.

Sosius Priscus is known for possessing the longest attested name of the ancient Romans. This was due to the practice of polyonymy, where elements of his ancestor's name were incorporated into his own. In full, his name is: 

 Quintus Pompeius Senecio Roscius Murena Coelius Sextus Iulius Frontinus Silius Decianus Gaius Iulius Eurycles Herculaneus Lucius Vibullius Pius Augustanus Alpinus Bellicius Sollers Iulius Aper Ducenius Proculus Rutilianus Rufinus Silius Valens Valerius Niger Claudius Fuscus Saxa Amyntianus Sosius Priscus

He received a portion of his lengthy name from his father, Quintus Pompeius Sosius Priscus, consul in AD 149, and, although the inscription that recorded his father's full name is damaged, enough of it survives to establish this:

 Quintus Pompeius [...] Bellicius Sollers Iulius Acer Ducenius Proculus Rutilianus Rufinus Silius Valens Valerius Niger Claudius Fuscus Saxa Amyntianus Sosius Priscus

Life 

An outline of Sosius Priscus' career is preserved, along with his full name, in the inscription . It shows his career began as the Praefectus feriarum Latinarum; this was followed by a posting as triumvir monetalis. Around the year AD 162, he stood and was elected as a candidate of the emperor for the office of quaestor; being the Emperor's candidate for one of the traditional magistracies was an important distinction, reserved either for members of the Patrician order or for those close to the emperor. Upon completion of this office qualified the holder for admission into the Senate. Next he was appointed legatus, serving under his father who was the proconsular governor of the province of Asia, possibly around the year AD 163/164. As a patrician, he was allowed to skip holding either the office of aedile or plebeian tribune. Finally, Priscus was elected to the office of praetor, possibly around AD 167.

In AD 169, Sosius Priscus was elected consul ordinarius with Publius Coelius Apollinaris as his colleague. He was then appointed to the proconsular posting of praefectus alimentorum (or the officer responsible for organising Rome's food supply). This was followed by his appointment as proconsular governor of Asia at an unknown date.

A member of the College of Pontiffs, Sosius Priscus was married to Ceionia Fabia. They had at least one son, Quintus Pompeius Sosius Falco, who was appointed consul in AD 193.

Sources
 PIR ² P 651

References

2nd-century Romans
Imperial Roman consuls
Roman governors of Asia
Claudii
Julii
Senecio Sosius Priscus, Quintus
Roscii
Sosii
Valerii
Year of birth unknown
Year of death unknown
Moneyers of ancient Rome